Swango may refer to:
Juliet Swango, a founder of The Rondelles indiepop band
Michael Swango (born 1954), American serial killer doctor
Swango (album), a 1998 album by Candye Kane
Swango, a song from Candye Kane's album Swango
Swango (musical), a 2002 musical by Rupert Holmes